Adam Zolotin (born November 29, 1983, in New York City, New York) is an American actor, best known for appearing in Leave It to Beaver and Jack.

Filmography

Film 
 Jack (1996) as Louis Durante
 Leave It to Beaver (1997) as Eddie Haskell
 Dog's Best Friend (1997) as Wylie Thompson
 Zerophilia (2005) as Chad
 What News? (2007) as Tommy
 Lonely Boy (2013) as Mike

Television 
 Law & Order (1996) as Lonnie Rickman (1 episode)
 Love and Marriage (1996) as Christopher Nardini
 Storm of the Century (1996) as Davey Hopewell
 Law & Order: SVU (2000) as Justin McKenna (1 episode)
 What I Like About You (2005) as Chris's Friend (1 episode)
 The New Adventures of Old Christine (2006) as Mark (1 episode)
 Scrubs (2004) as Reuben (1 episode)
 Mr. Robot (2016) as David (1 episode)

Theater 
 Sirens

Recognition

Awards and nominations 
 1996, YoungStar Awards nomination for 'Best Young Actor in a Comedy Film' for Jack
 1996, Young Artist Awards nomination for 'Best Performance in a Feature Film - Supporting Young Actor' for Jack
 1998, Young Artist Awards nomination for 'Best Performance in a Feature Film - Supporting Young Actor' for Leave It to Beaver

References

External links 
 

American male child actors
Living people
1983 births
American male film actors
American male television actors
Male actors from New York City
20th-century American male actors
21st-century American male actors